Anton Hagop is an ARIA award-winning music producer / engineer from Australia who has worked with silverchair, Powderfinger, Missy Higgins. and Birds of Tokyo.

In 2002 he won the ARIA Engineer of the Year award for his work on silverchair’s iconic Diorama album, which spent 50 weeks in the ARIA charts and exceeded triple platinum sales.

References

ARIA Award winners
Australian audio engineers
Living people
Australian record producers
Year of birth missing (living people)